Statistics of the USFSA Football Championship in the 1911 season.

Tournament

First round
 Racing Club Franc-Comtois de Besançon 0-3 FC International Lyon 
 Racing Club de Reims 5-0 Cercle des Sports Stade Lorrain
 Angers Université Club 12-0 Union sportive de Tours
 Amiens SC 1-6 FC Rouen

1/8 Final  
 RC France 3-1 AS Trouville-Deauville
 Olympique Lillois 8-1 Football club de Braux 
 Olympique de Cette 3-1 Stade toulousain
 SH Marseille 9-0 Stade Raphaëlois
 FC International Lyon 2-1 Sporting Club Dauphinois
.Union sportive Servannaise 0-2 Angers Université Club  
 FC Rouen 2-1 Racing Club de Reims
Sport athlétique bordelais 6-0 Sporting Club angérien

Quarterfinals  
 FC Rouen 4-1 Olympique Lillois
 RC France 1-0 Union sportive Servannaise
 Olympique de Cette 3-0 Sport athlétique bordelais
 FC International Lyon 0-2 SH Marseille

Semifinals 
 Olympique de Cette 0-4 SH Marseille  
 FC Rouen 1-2 RC France

Final  
SH Marseille 3-2 RC France

References
RSSF

USFSA Football Championship
1
France